Andrei Tsaryov (born January 8, 1977) is a Russian former professional ice hockey forward, who became a coach after completing his career as a player.

Awards and honors

References

External links
Biographical information and career statistics from Eliteprospects.com, or The Internet Hockey Database

1977 births
Living people
Ak Bars Kazan players
HC Neftekhimik Nizhnekamsk players
HC Lada Togliatti players
Torpedo Nizhny Novgorod players
Amur Khabarovsk players
Kazakhmys Satpaev players
Barys Nur-Sultan players
HC Izhstal players
Ariada Volzhsk players